Douglas Owen Hopkins (April 11, 1961 – December 5, 1993) was an American musician and songwriter. He co-founded Gin Blossoms, a popular modern rock band of the early 1990s, with Richard Taylor. He was the band's lead guitarist and a principal songwriter. Hopkins' writing credits included the hits "Hey Jealousy", "Found Out About You", "Hold Me Down" and "Lost Horizons".

Hopkins died by suicide in 1993 after suffering from mental health issues and alcoholism.

Early life and education
Hopkins was born in Seattle, Washington, and raised in Tempe, Arizona. He graduated from Tempe's McClintock High School in 1979, and two years later, while attending Arizona State University, formed his first rock band with Bill Leen. Hopkins was the guitarist and Leen the bassist, although neither knew how to play the instruments. Hopkins graduated from Arizona State in 1985 with a degree in sociology.

Career 
By 1987, Hopkins and Leen formed Gin Blossoms, and in 1988, Jesse Valenzuela and Phillip Rhodes signed on as the band's second guitarist and drummer, respectively. Robin Wilson, the band's eventual lead singer, joined in 1988 as well.

Hopkins had suffered from chronic depression since childhood and had been battling alcoholism for several years. However, in 1990, Gin Blossoms were one of the hottest local bands in Tempe and the surrounding areas, and they signed a contract with A&M Records.

Hopkins was resistant to signing to a major label, feeling like its property, and reacted with stubbornness and more drinking. When the band recorded its second studio album New Miserable Experience in February 1992, it was reported that Hopkins was unable to stand during his recording sessions. Faced with the prospect of firing Hopkins or being dropped by A&M, the band terminated Hopkins. Doused in aftershave and mouthwash to cover the effects of his days-long drinking binge, he was flown back to Arizona.

Hopkins was replaced by Scott Johnson. The band then withheld $15,000 owed to Hopkins until he agreed to sign over half of his publishing royalties. Hopkins was also required to relinquish his mechanical royalties to Johnson, his replacement. Hopkins reluctantly agreed to these demands because of his dire financial situation. While New Miserable Experience did not make a strong debut, it went on to become a multi-platinum album.

After he returned to Tempe, Hopkins started another band, The Chimeras, with brothers Lawrence and Mark Zubia. Hopkins soon quit the band after a live performance went poorly. Shortly before his death, Hopkins appeared on stage with Dead Hot Workshop and Hans Olson in Tucson. The Chimeras later changed their name to The Pistoleros, upon signing a short-lived recording contract. The first several singles released by Gin Blossoms, and the only mainstream hit released by the Pistoleros prior to being dropped by their label, were penned by Hopkins.

Death 
As Gin Blossoms experienced mounting success performing songs he had written, Hopkins became increasingly despondent. Although he had always dreamed of having a gold record, when he received one (for the song "Hey Jealousy"), he hung it up for two weeks before taking it down and then destroying it. Nine days later, after an intake consultation in the detox unit of Phoenix's St. Luke's Hospital, Hopkins purchased a .38 caliber pistol. The next day, December 5, 1993, Hopkins died by suicide.

In 1994, Larry Rudolph of the New York firm of Rudolph & Beer, which represented the Hopkins estate, announced that eighteen songs were found and were open for a recording deal. Circa 2000, award-winning documentarian Mark Stanoch secured the rights to Hopkins’ music and story for a biopic potentially starring Ethan Hawke, but plans got bogged down.

Footnotes

External links
 Lost Horizons – A Tribute To Doug Hopkins
 
 Metro Times – Jesus of Suburbia

1961 births
1993 deaths
20th-century American guitarists
20th-century American male writers
Alternative rock guitarists
American alternative rock musicians
American male guitarists
American male songwriters
American rock guitarists
American rock songwriters
Arizona State University alumni
Gin Blossoms members
Guitarists from Arizona
Lead guitarists
People from Tempe, Arizona
People with mood disorders
Songwriters from Arizona
Suicides by firearm in Arizona
20th-century American writers
1993 suicides
20th-century American male musicians